Snell is a Cornish surname of Celtic-Brythonic origin which originated within the kingdom of Cornwall. The word snell means quick or brisk in Kernewek and literally translates to meaning quick in English  .

People 
Annette Snell (1945–1977), American R&B singer
Belinda Snell (born 1981), Australian basketball player
Benny Snell (born 1998), American football player
Bertrand Snell (1870–1958), American politician
Blake Snell (born 1992), American baseball player
David Snell (disambiguation)
Earl Snell (1895–1947), American politician and Governor of Oregon
Edward Snell (cricketer)  (1906–1973) English cricketer
Edward Snell (engineer) (1820–1880), British and Australian diarist, artist, engineer and surveyor
Frida Snell (born 1981), Swedish pop/rock singer
Edward Snell, mayor of Durban, South Africa (1856–1857, 1867–1868, 1868–1869)
Gareth Snell (born 1986), British politician
George Davis Snell (1903–1996), American geneticist and Nobel Prize winner
Hannah Snell (1723–1792), British soldier
Harold Snell (Darwin businessman) (1892–1949), Australian soldier, miner and businessman
Harry Snell, 1st Baron Snell (1865–1944), British politician
Henry B. Snell (1858–1943), English-American painter
Henry Saxon Snell (1831–1904), British architect
Howard Dunster Snell (born 1936), British trumpet player, composer and conductor
Ian Snell (born 1981), American baseball player
Joyce Snell (born 1930), British statistician
J. Laurie Snell (born 1928-2011), American mathematician
John Snell (disambiguation)
Matt Snell (born 1941), American professional football player
Nicholas Snell (disambiguation), English politicians
Peter Snell (1938–2019), New Zealand athlete
Peter Snell (producer), Canadian film producer
Princess Snell (born 1992), Filipina actress
Richard Snell (disambiguation)
Roderick Snell (born 1940), British electronics engineer
Roy J. Snell (1878–1959), American writer
Ted Snell (born 1946), Canadian ice hockey player
Tony Snell (RAF officer) (1922–2013), RAF pilot and World War II escapee
Tony Snell (poet) (born 1938), Cornish teacher, linguist, scholar, singer, waterman, and poet
Tony Snell (basketball) (born 1991), American basketball player
Wally Snell (1889–1980), American baseball player and mycologist
Willebrord Snellius or Snell (1580–1626), Dutch mathematician (Snell's law)

Fictional characters
Balso Snell, in the 1931 novel The Dream Life of Balso Snell by Nathanael West
Robert and Linda Snell, characters in The Archers, a radio soap opera
Sue Snell, in the 1974 novel Carrie by Stephen King
June Snell, appeared in Only Fools and Horses episodes "Happy Returns" & "A Royal Flush"
Jacob & Darlene Snell, characters in Ozark, an American crime drama series on Netflix

See also
John Blashford-Snell, British explorer
Snel and Snellen, Dutch versions of the surname
Schnell, German version of the surname

References